Slobodan Marović (Cyrillic: Cлободан Mapoвић, born 13 July 1964) is a Montenegrin football manager and retired player.

He is best known for his spell with Red Star Belgrade in the 1980s and early 1990s, being part of the side's European Cup victory in 1991.

Playing career

Club
Born in Bar, SR Montenegro, during his playing career he played for NK Osijek, IFK Norrköping, and Silkeborg IF.

International
Marović made his debut for Yugoslavia in an August 1987 friendly match against the Soviet Union and has earned a total of 4 caps, scoring no goals. His final international was a November 1989 friendly against Brazil.

Managerial career
In December 2010 he has been appointed as assistant manager of Robert Prosinečki at Red Star Belgrade.

Honours
Red Star Belgrade
European Cup: 1991
Yugoslav Championship: 1988, 1990, 1991
Yugoslav Cup: 1990

References

External links

1964 births
Living people
People from Bar, Montenegro
Serbs of Montenegro
Association football defenders
Yugoslav footballers
Yugoslavia international footballers
Serbia and Montenegro footballers
NK Osijek players
Red Star Belgrade footballers
IFK Norrköping players
Silkeborg IF players
Shenzhen F.C. players
Yugoslav First League players
Allsvenskan players
Danish Superliga players
Chinese Super League players
Serbia and Montenegro expatriate footballers
Expatriate footballers in Sweden
Serbia and Montenegro expatriate sportspeople in Sweden
Expatriate men's footballers in Denmark
Serbia and Montenegro expatriate sportspeople in Denmark
Expatriate footballers in China
Serbia and Montenegro expatriate sportspeople in China
Red Star Belgrade non-playing staff
Guangzhou City F.C. non-playing staff